Carnival of Conache (spanish:Carnaval de Conache), is a festival held each year in the peruvian town of  Conache, located nearby Trujillo city at southeast. It consists of several activities including the crowning of the queen, and a big celebration with the ancient drink called Chicha.

Description
The carnival is a costumbrist event and it has been held since the 16 years old, villagers performed a popular carnival festival in Conache, it consists of several events and activities including the crowning of the queen,  the carnival party among others.

Events
The principal events are:
Sports for the carnaval it takes place a marathon.
Typical foods, one of the most requested is fried cuy.
Presentation of the queen
Paso horses
Marinera dance
Palo Cilulo, the people dance around a tree decorated with presents and other carnival things, this tree is also called "unsha", "Yunza", "Corta monte", or "Umisha", and while the people dance around someone turns to cut the tree little by little with an Axe for a little while then more people makes the same until it falls down. When this happens people come to the tree to take the presents while people plays with water and some colored creams for their faces. Generally the dances in the palo cilulo are entertained by bands of musicians with huayno music.
Carnaval Party, is celebrated in the central day.

See also
Lake Conache
Carnival of Huanchaco
Trujillo Spring Festival
San Jose Festival
Trujillo Book Festival
Trujillo
Santiago de Huamán
Victor Larco Herrera District
Laredo District

External links
Location of Conache (Trujillo city) (Wikimapia)
Carnival of Conache

Media

References

Festivals in Trujillo, Peru